Wolverton is part of Milton Keynes, Buckinghamshire, England.

Wolverton may also refer to:

Places
In Australia
 Wolverton, West End, a heritage-listed house in Townsville, Queensland, Australia
In England
Wolverton, Kent
Wolverton, Hampshire
Wolverton Common, Hampshire
Wolverton, Shropshire
Wolverton, Warwickshire
Wolverton, Wiltshire

In the United States
Wolverton, Minnesota
Wolverton Township, Wilkin County, Minnesota

Other uses
Wolverton (surname)
Baron Wolverton

See also
Woolverton
 Wolferton
 Wolverhampton